G. Wallace "Wally" Caulk Jr. (born February 7, 1941) is an American politician. He was a Republican member of the Delaware House of Representatives, representing District 33 from 1985 until his retirement in 2006.

References

1941 births
Living people
People from Milford, Delaware
Members of the Delaware House of Representatives